Dørkampen is a mountain in Skjåk Municipality in Innlandet county, Norway. The mountain is surrounded by several other notable mountains including Høggøymen to the west, Sponghøi to the north, Digerkampen to the northeast, Holhøi to the east, Blåhøe to the southeast, and Stamåhjulet to the south.

See also
List of mountains of Norway

References

Skjåk
Mountains of Innlandet